is a common name for the area around Akihabara Station in the Chiyoda ward of Tokyo, Japan. There also exists an administrative district called Akihabara in the Taitō ward further north of Akihabara Station, but it is not the place people generally refer to as Akihabara.

Akihabara gained the nickname  shortly after World War II for being a major shopping center for household electronic goods and the post-war black market.

Akihabara is considered by many to be the epicentre of modern Japanese otaku culture, and is a major shopping district for video games, anime, manga, electronics and computer-related goods. Icons from popular anime and manga are displayed prominently on the shops in the area, and numerous maid cafés and some arcades are found throughout the district.

Geography
The main area of Akihabara is located on a street just west of Akihabara Station, where most of the major shops are situated. Most of the electronics shops are just west of the station, and the anime and manga shops and the cosplay cafés are north of them.

There exists an administrative district called Akihabara in the Taitō ward further north of the station, but it is not the place which people generally refer to as Akihabara. It borders on Sotokanda in between Akihabara and Okachimachi stations, but is half occupied by JR tracks.

History

The area that is now Akihabara was once near a city gate of Edo and served as a passage between the city and northwestern Japan. This made the region a home to many craftsmen and tradesmen, as well as some low-class samurai. One of Tokyo's frequent fires destroyed the area in 1869, and the people decided to replace the buildings of the area with a shrine called Chinkasha (now known as Akiba Shrine  ), meaning fire extinguisher shrine, in an attempt to prevent the spread of future fires. The locals nicknamed the shrine Akiba after the deity that could control fire, and the area around it became known as Akibagahara and later Akihabara. After Akihabara Station was built in 1888, the shrine was moved to the Taitō ward where it still resides today.

Since its opening in 1890, Akihabara Station became a major freight transit point, which allowed a vegetable and fruit market to spring up in the district. Then, in the 1920s, the station saw a large volume of passengers after opening for public transport, and after World War II, the black market thrived in the absence of a strong government. This disconnection of Akihabara from government authority has allowed the district to grow as a market city and given rise to an excellent atmosphere for entrepreneurship. In the 1930s, this climate turned Akihabara into a future-oriented market region specializing in household electronics, such as washing machines, refrigerators, televisions, and stereos, earning Akihabara the nickname "Electric Town".

As household electronics began to lose their futuristic appeal in the 1980s, the shops of Akihabara shifted their focus to home computers at a time when they were only used by specialists and hobbyists. This new specialization brought in a new type of consumer, computer nerds or otaku. The market in Akihabara naturally latched onto their new customer base that was focused on anime, manga, and video games. The connection between Akihabara and otaku has survived and grown to the point that the region is now known worldwide as a center for otaku culture, and some otaku even consider Akihabara to be a sacred place.

Otaku culture

The influence of otaku culture has shaped Akihabara's businesses and buildings to reflect the interests of otaku and gained the district worldwide fame for its distinctive imagery. Akihabara tries to create an atmosphere as close as possible to the game and anime worlds of customers' interest. The streets of Akihabara are covered with anime and manga icons, and cosplayers line the sidewalks handing out advertisements, especially for maid cafés. Release events, special events, and conventions in Akihabara give anime and manga fans frequent opportunities to meet the creators of the works they follow and strengthen the connection between the region and otaku culture. The design of many of the buildings serves to create the sort of atmosphere that draws in otaku. Architects design the stores of Akihabara to be more opaque and closed to reflect the general desire of many otaku to live in their anime worlds rather than display their interests to the world at large.

Akihabara's role as a free market has also allowed a large amount of amateur work to find a passionate audience in the otaku who frequent the area. Doujinshi (amateur or fanmade manga based on an anime/manga/game) has been growing in Akihabara since the 1970s when publishers began to drop manga that were not ready for large markets. Comiket is largest spot sale of Doujinshi in Japan.

See also

Akiba-kei
Akihabara Trilogy
Kanda Shrine, Shinto shrine near Akihabara
Nipponbashi, in Osaka
Ōsu, in Nagoya
Tourism in Japan

References

External links

 Akihabara Area Tourism Organization
 Akihabara Electrical Town Organization website
 Go Tokyo Akihabara Guide

 
Chiyoda, Tokyo
Electronics districts
Neighborhoods of Tokyo
Otaku
Shopping districts and streets in Japan
Taitō
Tourist attractions in Tokyo